NGC 3945 is a barred lenticular galaxy in the constellation Ursa Major. It was discovered on March 19, 1790 by the astronomer William Herschel.

NGC 3945 has a complex structure, with two concentric bars and a pseudobulge. Unlike classical bulges which are like miniature elliptical galaxies, pseudobulges have features similar to disk galaxies, including a flattened structure and significant rotation. It is classified as a LINER galaxy. The formation history of NGC 3945 is likely quite complex, with the pseudo-bulge being formed gradually from disk material, while bulges (spheroidal components) would have formed from violent merger events.

However, it is also possible that NGC 3945 has no central black hole at all.

References

External links 

Ursa Major (constellation)
3945
Barred lenticular galaxies
LINER galaxies
037258